The 2020–21 Egypt Cup qualifying rounds open the 89th season of the competition in Egypt, the oldest association football single knockout competition in Africa.

A large number of clubs did not enter the competition due to various reasons, mainly due to the COVID-19 pandemic in Egypt, alongside other reasons such as financial status. Only 156 clubs registered to participate in this season's qualifying rounds, 74 less than the previous season. This led the Egyptian Football Association to reduce the number of the qualifying rounds to four rounds only instead of five, with participating teams from the 2020–21 Egyptian Second Division entering at the second preliminary round instead of the third.

Calendar
The calendar for the 2020–21 Egypt Cup qualifying rounds, as announced by the Egyptian Football Association.

First Preliminary Round
The First Preliminary Round fixtures were played on 12 and 13 January 2021. A total of 112 teams from the Egyptian Third Division and the Egyptian Fourth Division entered at this stage of the competition. The results were as follows:

The following team(s) received a bye for this round:

Akhmim
Nasser El Fekreia

Second Preliminary Round
The Second Preliminary Round fixtures were played between 17 and 26 January 2021. A total of 44 teams from the Egyptian Second Division entered at this stage of the competition. The results were as follows:

The following team(s) received a bye for this round:

Ashmoun
Beni Mazar
El Dakhleya
Al Hammam
Al Hamoul
HCHD
Ittihad Nabarouh
Malawy
MS Bedway
Porto Suez
El Qanah

Third Preliminary Round
The Third Preliminary Round fixtures were played between 31 January and 2 February 2021. The results were as follows:

Fourth Preliminary Round
The Fourth Preliminary Round fixtures were played on 5 and 6 February 2021. The results were as follows:

Competition proper

Winners from the Fourth Preliminary Round advanced to the Round of 32, where teams from the Egyptian Premier League will enter the competition.

Notes

References

qualifying rounds
Egypt Cup qualifying rounds